Accounting Horizons is a peer-reviewed academic journal published by the American Accounting Association.

Accounting Horizons commenced publication in 1999.  Its intended audience is both academics and professionals, including regulators and accounting students.  The journal is ranked and tracked by SCImago.

References

Accounting journals